Valeriu Gaiu (born 6 February 2001) is a Moldovan professional footballer who plays as a right-back for FC Bălți, on loan from Sheriff Tiraspol.

Career
Gaiu made his debut for Sheriff Tiraspol in the Moldovan National Division on 3 July 2020 in a 2–0 win against Speranța Nisporeni. On 2 July 2021, it was announced that he had joined Dinamo-Auto Tiraspol on a loan deal. In February 2022, he joined Bălți on loan.

References

External links

2001 births
Living people
Association football fullbacks
Moldovan footballers
FC Sheriff Tiraspol players
FC Dinamo-Auto Tiraspol players
CSF Bălți players
Moldovan Super Liga players
Moldova youth international footballers
Moldova under-21 international footballers
Real Succes Chișinău players